This article comprises four sortable tables of mountain summits of Central America that are the higher than any other point north or south of their latitude or east or west their longitude in the region.

The summit of a mountain or hill may be measured in three principal ways:
The topographic elevation of a summit measures the height of the summit above a geodetic sea level.
The topographic prominence of a summit is a measure of how high the summit rises above its surroundings.
The topographic isolation (or radius of dominance) of a summit measures how far the summit lies from its nearest point of equal elevation.



Northernmost high summits

Southernmost high summits

Easternmost high summits

Westernmost high summits

Volcán Tacaná and Volcán Tajumulco are the two highest summits of Central America.

Gallery

See also

List of mountain peaks of North America
List of mountain peaks of Greenland
List of mountain peaks of Canada
List of mountain peaks of the Rocky Mountains
List of mountain peaks of the United States
List of mountain peaks of México
List of mountain peaks of Central America
List of the ultra-prominent summits of Central America

List of mountain peaks of the Caribbean
Central America
Geography of Central America
Geology of Central America
:Category:Mountains of Central America
commons:Category:Mountains of Central America
Physical geography
Topography
Topographic elevation
Topographic prominence
Topographic isolation

Notes

References

External links
Bivouac.com
Peakbagger.com
Peaklist.org
Peakware.com
Summitpost.org

Mountains of Central America
Geography of Central America

Central America-related lists